Fountain Geyser is a geyser in the Lower Geyser Basin of Yellowstone National Park in the United States.

Fountain is the dominant member of a group of geysers at the Fountain Paint Pots thermal area. Morning Geyser, which erupts from a vent close to Fountain's, is larger, but is inactive during most years. Fountain, by contrast, is usually active. Intervals (= eruption start to eruption start) vary from year to year but are commonly about 4.5 to 6 hours, with occasional longer intervals of 11 to 12 hours. Durations of eruptions are typically about 30 minutes. Occasionally, Fountain departs from its usual behavior and enters so-called "wild-phase" eruption, during which the height is much reduced but the duration can be as long as two weeks.

Fountain is not to be confused with similarly named, and nearby (and larger), Great Fountain Geyser, another of the major features of Lower Geyser Basin, adjacent to the Firehole Lake road.

References

Geysers of Wyoming
Geothermal features of Teton County, Wyoming
Geothermal features of Yellowstone National Park
Geysers of Teton County, Wyoming